Sydney Charles Wooderson MBE (30 August 1914 – 21 December 2006), dubbed "The Mighty Atom", was an English athlete whose peak career was in the 1930s and 1940s.

He set the world mile record of 4:06.4 at London’s Motspur Park on 28 August 1937. This record stood for nearly five years.

Career
Born in Camberwell, London, he was  5 ft 6 in and weighed less than 9 stone (126 lbs). He attended Sutton Valence School, Kent. At 18 he became the first British schoolboy to break 4min 30sec for the mile. He won the British mile title for the five years up to the outbreak of the war in 1939. In 1934 he won the silver medal in the one mile event at the British Empire Games.

At the 1936 Summer Olympics in Berlin, he suffered an ankle injury and failed to qualify for the 1500 metres final. However, in 1937, after surgery, his performance increased and culminated in his world mile record of 4:06.4 in 1937. In 1938 he set world records in the 800 m and 880 yards with times of 1:48.4 and 1:49.2, respectively.

Off the track Wooderson was a City of London solicitor and missed the 1938 Empire Games in Sydney because he was taking his law finals.

His poor eyesight ruled him out of active service during the Second World War. He joined the Royal Pioneer Corps and was a firefighter during the Blitz and then later, in the Royal Electrical and Mechanical Engineers as a radar operator. In 1944, he spent several months in hospital suffering from rheumatic fever and was warned by doctors he might never run again.

Immediately after the war, however, in 1945, he ran his fastest mile, 4:04.2, just behind Arne Andersson of Sweden. In Oslo at the 1946 European Championships, he won the 5,000 m in 14:08.6, the second-fastest time to that point. His versatility was demonstrated when he won the national cross-country title in 1948.

He was the natural choice to carry the Olympic torch into Wembley Stadium for the 1948 Summer Olympics. However he was turned away at the last minute because members of the organising committee wanted a more handsome final runner. They chose the relatively unknown John Mark instead.

He was appointed a Member of the Order of the British Empire (MBE) in the 2000 Birthday Honours for services to Blackheath Harriers and athletics.

Wooderson lived in retirement in Dorset in the South of England. He remained a life member of Blackheath Harriers and was twice its president. He died on Thursday 21 December 2006 in a nursing home at Wareham, Dorset. His ashes are interred in the churchyard of Lady St. Mary's Church, Wareham.

In 2018 the first full-length biography of Wooderson was published - 'Sydney Wooderson: A Very British Hero' (Book Guild)- written by Rob Hadgraft, author of previous works on runners Alf Shrubb, Walter George, 'Deerfoot', Jim Peters and Arthur Newton. The Wooderson title runs to 400-plus pages and was highly acclaimed in the sporting press.

References

Further reading

Obituaries
The Times – 23 December 2006.
Athletics Weekly – By Jason Henderson, 22 December 2006
Daily Telegraph Britain loses its first great miler By Tom Knight 22 December 2006
Hardloopnieuws Netherlands by Tom Knight, 2006-12-22
  International Association of Athletics Federations – IAAF by Steven Downes, 8 January 2007
 Sports Journalists Association 23 January 2007. Contains a detailed description of his world record breaking run.
  Dorset Echo Death of ‘hero’ runner Sydney By Juliette Astrup,  29 December 2006. Contains a recent photograph of Sydney Wooderson.

Other

 'Sydney Wooderson - A Very British Hero' (Book Guild, 2018) by Rob Hadgraft. 406 pages, illustrated. .
Times article When did Sydney Wooderson break the world mile record?  Questions & Answers, 27 November 2005
Biography at the Blackheath Harriers webpage
Thurlow, David, "Sydney Wooderson – Forgotten Champion", (55 pages) available from Brian A Saxton, 56 Bourne Way, Hayes, Kent, BR2 7EY

External links
 

1914 births
2006 deaths
English male middle-distance runners
Olympic athletes of Great Britain
Athletes (track and field) at the 1936 Summer Olympics
Athletes (track and field) at the 1934 British Empire Games
Commonwealth Games silver medallists for England
World record setters in athletics (track and field)
Deaths from kidney failure
People from Camberwell
Royal Electrical and Mechanical Engineers soldiers
Royal Pioneer Corps soldiers
Members of the Order of the British Empire
British Army personnel of World War II
People educated at Sutton Valence School
European Athletics Championships medalists
Commonwealth Games medallists in athletics
Medallists at the 1934 British Empire Games